Edbert Charles Buss (1884 – April 11, 1935) was an American football and basketball coach. He served as the head football coach (1916–1920) and head basketball coach (1916–1921) at DePauw University in Greencastle, Indiana. Buss previously served as the head football coach at Detroit Central High School from 1914 to 1915, where his team was crowned the mythical High School Football National Champion in 1915.

Buss died at the age of 51, on April 11, 1935, in Grand Rapids, Michigan. He had undergone surgery for acute appendicitis several days earlier.

References

External links
 

1884 births
1935 deaths
DePauw Tigers athletic directors
DePauw Tigers football coaches
DePauw Tigers men's basketball coaches
High school basketball coaches in Michigan
High school football coaches in Michigan
Michigan State University alumni